Real Madrid Castilla Club de Fútbol is a Spanish football team that plays in Primera Federación – Group 1 for the 2022–23 season. It is Real Madrid's reserve team. They play their home games at the Alfredo Di Stéfano Stadium with a capacity of 6,000 seats.

Reserve teams in Spain play in the same league system as their senior team rather than a separate league. Reserve teams, however, cannot play in the same division as their senior team. Therefore, Real Madrid Castilla are ineligible for promotion to the La Liga as long as Real Madrid plays there. Consequently, they must play at least one level below their main side and they are not eligible to play in the Copa del Rey. In addition, only under-23 players, or under-25 players with a professional contract, can switch between senior and reserve teams.

History

AD Plus Ultra
In 1948, Agrupación Deportiva Plus Ultra, a local amateur team, then playing in the Tercera División, agreed to become a feeder club for Real Madrid. Originally formed in 1930, the team took its name from the national motto of Spain. Real gave AD Plus Ultra financial support and in return were given first refusal on the club's best players. By 1949, they made their debut in the Segunda División and in 1952, the club became the official Real reserve team. In 1959, they reached the quarter-finals of the Copa del Generalísimo, losing 7–2 on aggregate to eventual runners-up Granada.

During the 1950s and 1960s, future senior Real Madrid players and Spanish internationals such as José María Zárraga, Enrique Mateos, Ramón Marsal, Pedro Casado, Juan Manuel Villa, José María Vidal, Fernando Serena and Ramón Grosso all spent time at the club, and Juan Alonso finished off his career there. Miguel Muñoz began his coaching career at the club. In 1972, Plus Ultra folded because of the demise of the insurance company of the same name, and their position in the Tercera División was taken by Castilla Club de Fútbol, the new reserve team for Real Madrid, on 21 July.

Castilla CF

As Castilla CF, the team enjoyed something of a golden age. During this era, with a team that included Agustín, Ricardo Gallego and Francisco Pineda, Castilla reached the final of the 1979–80 Copa del Rey. During their cup run, they beat four Primera División teams, including Hércules, Athletic Bilbao, Real Sociedad and Sporting de Gijón. The latter two eventually finished second and third in the Primera División. In the final, they played Real Madrid but lost 6–1. Because Real also won the Primera División, however, Castilla qualified for the 1980–81 European Cup Winners' Cup. Despite beating West Ham United 3–1 in the opening game at the Santiago Bernabéu, they lost the return 5–1 after extra time and went out in the first round. Castilla reached the quarter-finals of the Copa del Rey on three further occasions, in 1984, 1986, and 1988.

In 1984, with Amancio Amaro as coach, Castilla won the Segunda División. Amaro's tenure as coach saw the rise of the famous La Quinta del Buitre – Emilio Butragueño, Manolo Sanchís, Martín Vázquez, Míchel, and Miguel Pardeza. Castilla were ineligible for promotion, however, because Real Madrid were already in the Primera División. In the 1987–88 season, they finished third in the Segunda División, but were once again ineligible for promotion.

Real Madrid B
In 1991, the Royal Spanish Football Federation banned the use of separate names for reserve teams  and Castilla CF became known as Real Madrid Deportiva and then Real Madrid B. In the early 1990s, two former Castilla players, Vicente del Bosque and Rafael Benítez, began their coaching careers with the team. In 1997, the team was relegated to the Segunda División B, but despite this, they continued to produce internationally acclaimed players. These have included Raúl, Guti and Iker Casillas, who all became established members of the senior Real Madrid team.

Real Madrid Castilla
In the 2004–05 season, coach Juan Ramón López Caro guided the team back to the Segunda División and the team subsequently revived the El Castilla name and became known as Real Madrid Castilla. In 2006, the new stadium of the club's training facilities Ciudad Real Madrid was named the Alfredo Di Stéfano Stadium and Francisco Moreno Cariñena became the first independent chairman in 16 years. In this year, the team also has continued to produce quality players such as Roberto Soldado and Álvaro Arbeloa.

In the 2006–2007 season, the team was relegated to the Segunda División B under the management of ex-Real Madrid legend Míchel after occupying 19th place in the league in a disappointing season. Míchel received a lot of criticism and accepted all the blame for the team's bad performances, especially for those who had a wonderful season in the 2005–06 season, such as Rubén de la Red, Esteban Granero and Javi García. The reserves produced other quality players, including Juan Mata and Álvaro Negredo.

Real Madrid Castilla was promoted back to the Segunda División at the end of the 2011–12 season after beating Cádiz in the play-offs with an aggregate of score 8–1 and this year the club produced one quality player, Dani Carvajal who was sold to Bayer Leverkusen in 2012 before he returned to Real Madrid in 2013 to play in the first team.

In the 2013–14 season, three quality players Nacho, Álvaro Morata and Jesé were promoted to the first team, and then Castilla was relegated in the last matchday after being defeated by Real Murcia in the last match of the season.

Since 2014 when they played in the third division, Castilla continued to produce other quality players, including Lucas Vázquez, Fernando Pacheco, Borja Mayoral, Marcos Llorente, Sergio Reguilón, Óscar Rodríguez and Achraf Hakimi.

In the 2019–20 season, the team was coached by Raúl, a legendary ex-Real Madrid player.

Season by season

 As AD Plus Ultra

 As Castilla CF

 As a reserve team

 33 seasons in Segunda División
 2 seasons in Primera División RFEF/Primera Federación
 22 seasons in Segunda División B
 20 seasons in Tercera División

European record
European Cup Winners' Cup:

Honours
Segunda División
Winners: 1983–84
Segunda División B
Winners: 1990–91, 2001–02, 2004–05, 2011–12
Tercera División
Winners: 1948–49, 1954–55, 1956–57, 1963–64, 1965–66, 1967–68

Players

Current squad
.

From Youth Academy

Out on loan

Personnel

Current technical staff

 Last updated: 1 September 2020
 Source:

Coaches

Records

Top scorers (all competitions)

Appearances (all competitions)

Stadium

On 9 May 2006, the Alfredo Di Stéfano Stadium was inaugurated at the City of Madrid where Real Madrid usually trains. The inaugural match was between Real Madrid and Stade de Reims, a rematch of the European Cup final won by Real Madrid in 1956. Real Madrid won the inaugural match 6–1 with goals from Sergio Ramos, Antonio Cassano (2), Roberto Soldado (2), and José Manuel Jurado.

The venue is part of the Ciudad Real Madrid, the club's new training facilities located outside Madrid in Valdebebas, near Madrid–Barajas Airport.

The capacity of the main stand at the west is 4,000 seats, with additional 2,000 seats at the eastern stand, giving the stadium a total capacity of 6,000 seats. It is envisaged to increase the seating capacity up to 25,000 at the completion of the expansion.

Notable players

Note: This list includes players that have appeared in at least 100 top league games and/or have reached international status.

  Antoni Lima
  Esteban Cambiasso
  Juan Esnáider
  Rolando Zárate
  Philipp Lienhart
  Casemiro
  César Prates
  Fabinho
  Pablo Felipe
  Filipe Luís
  Iarley
  Willian José
  Vinícius Júnior
  Rodrygo
  Valdo
  Flemming Povlsen
  Mariano Díaz
  Javier Balboa
  Rubén Belima
  Chupe
  Eero Markkanen
  Daniel Opare
  Ádám Szalai
  Andri Guðjohnsen
  Achraf Hakimi
  Mutiu Adepoju
  Christopher Ohen
  Martin Ødegaard
  Sergio Díaz
  Cristian Benavente
  Pedro Mendes
  Denis Cheryshev
  Antonio Adán
  Albert Aguilà
  Agustín
  Adolfo Aldana
  Marcos Alonso
  Mikel Antía
  Francisco José Antón
  Santiago Aragón
  Carlos Aranda
  Álvaro Arbeloa
  David Barral
  Miguel Bernal
  Antonio Blanco
  Alberto Bueno
  Burgui
  Emilio Butragueño
  José Callejón
  José Antonio Camacho
  José Luis Caminero
  Santiago Cañizares
  Dani Carvajal
  Kiko Casilla
  Iker Casillas
  Javier Castañeda
  Chendo
  Cholo
  Pedro Contreras
  Corona
  Enrique Corrales
  José Manuel Espinosa
  Kiko Femenía
  Alfonso Fraile
  Fernando Fernández
  Borja Fernández
  Fernando
  Ricardo Gallego
  Borja García
  Dani García
  Javi García
  José García Calvo
  Luis García
  Rafael García
  José Aurelio Gay
  Gerardo
  César Gómez
  Adrián González
  Esteban Granero
  Javi Guerrero
  Guti
  José Heredia
  Mario Hermoso
  Luis Hernández
  Isidro
  Jesé
  Joselu
  José María López
  Juanfran Moreno
  Juanfran Torres
  Juanjo
  Juankar
  Juanmi
  José Manuel Jurado
  Ángel Lanchas
  Diego Llorente
  Julio Llorente
  Marcos Llorente
  Julen Lopetegui
  Diego López
  José Alberto López
  Sebastián Losada
  Juan Maqueda
  Enrique Magdaleno
  Alberto Marcos
  Ángel Martín González
  Rafael Martín Vázquez
  Omar Mascarell
  Juan Mata
  Javier Maté
  Borja Mayoral
  Gonzalo Melero
  Míchel
  Mista
  Fernando Morán
  Álvaro Morata
  Rodrigo Moreno
  Juan Morgado
  Pedro Mosquera
  Nacho
  César Navas
  Álvaro Negredo
  José Ochotorena
  Antolín Ortega
  Fernando Pacheco
  Miguel Pardeza
  Javier Paredes
  Dani Parejo
  Paco Pavón
  Óscar Plano
  Ángel Pérez
  Alfonso Pérez
  Francisco Pineda
  Javier Portillo
  Quini
  Luis Miguel Ramis
  Raúl
  Rubén de la Red
  Sergio Reguilón
  Fran Rico
  Riki
  Alberto Rivera
  Ángel Rodríguez
  Francis Rodríguez
  Óscar Rodríguez
  Rubén
  Andrés Sabido
  José Antonio Salguero
  Jaime Sánchez
  Sergio Sánchez
  Víctor Sánchez
  Manolo Sanchís
  Sandro
  Isidoro San José
  José Luis Santamaría
  Fernando Sanz
  Pablo Sarabia
  Rubén Sobrino
  Jesús Solana
  Roberto Soldado
  Raúl de Tomás
  Javier Torres Gómez
  Miguel Torres
  Víctor Torres Mestre
  Roberto Trashorras
  Ismael Urzaiz
  Vicente Valcarce
  Borja Valero
  Lucas Vázquez
  Jesús Velasco
  Víctor
  Leandro Cabrera
  Federico Valverde
  Guillermo Varela
  Julio Álvarez

See also
 La Fábrica (Real Madrid)
 Real Madrid C
 Real Madrid Juvenil

References

External links
 Real Madrid Castilla Official club website
  Real Madrid Castilla News, Photos and Videos 
 Futbolme.com profile 
 BDFutbol team profile
  Castilla CF in Europe
  Segunda B Division Table
 Club & stadium history Estadios de España 

 
Real Madrid CF
Spanish reserve football teams
Football clubs in Madrid
Association football clubs established in 1930
1930 establishments in Spain
Segunda División clubs
Primera Federación clubs